Jordan Saling (born March 15, 1996) is a footballer who plays as a midfielder for Flower City Union in the National Independent Soccer Association. Born in the mainland United States, he represents the Puerto Rico national team.

Youth career
During his youth Saling played for Parsippany SC, NASA United, and Paramus Catholic High School.

College career
For the 2016/2017 season, Saling played college soccer for the Generals of Herkimer County Community College. He was the team's second-top scorer with twelve goals while adding nine assists as he started all twenty of the team's matches. He was named national player of the week, first team All Mountain Valley, first team All-Region, and to the NSCAA All East Team. For the 2017/18 season he transferred to Wilmington University. He made four appearances for the team that year after complications caused by a broken wrist early in the season. In 2018, he transferred once again and played for William Paterson Pioneers for the following two seasons. In total he started all thirty eight matches that he played, tallying twelve goals and three assists.

Club career
In 2018 Saling briefly joined Atlanta Silverbacks FC of the National Premier Soccer League. In 2018 he played for fellow-NPSL side FC Monmouth. He was the team's top scorer that season with four goals in nine appearances. Also following the 2018 season he was named to the Keystone Conference Best XI team. Saling moved abroad in summer 2019 and had a 3-month stint with KF Laçi of the Albanian Kategoria Superiore. After returning to the United States in August of that year, he joined Cedar Stars Rush of the USL League Two. He made one league appearance for the club that season.

Saling joined National Independent Soccer Association expansion side Flower City Union in November 2021.

International career
Saling made his senior international debut for Puerto Rico on June 2, 2021, in a 2022 FIFA World Cup qualification match against the Bahamas. He came on as a 74th-minute substitute in the eventual 7–0 victory.

Career statistics

International

References

External links
National Football Teams profile
Soccerway profile

1996 births
Living people
Puerto Rican footballers
Puerto Rico international footballers
American soccer players
American sportspeople of Puerto Rican descent
Association football forwards
Sportspeople from Passaic County, New Jersey
People from Haledon, New Jersey
Expatriate footballers in Albania
Puerto Rican expatriate footballers
American expatriate sportspeople in Albania
Soccer players from New Jersey
Wilmington Wildcats men's soccer players
William Paterson University alumni
National Premier Soccer League players
Atlanta Silverbacks players
KF Laçi players
USL League Two players
Flower City Union players
National Independent Soccer Association players